Mariela Ortiz (born August 5, 1976) is an American voice actress, who previously worked for ADV Films and currently for Funimation.  She's also an accomplished stage performer who has appeared in productions in both Texas and New York, including The Chico de Jazzz Show written by William M. Hoffman.

Filmography

Anime
 A Certain Scientific Railgun S -  Shinobu Nunotobata
 Angelic Layer - Ringo Seto
 Aquarian Age: Sign for Evolution - Kanae Morito
 Azumanga Daioh - Yuka (Ep. 12)
 Clannad - Harada
 Comic Party Revolution - Konomi
 D.N.Angel - Yuki Suzaki
 Diamond Daydreams - Jun
 Godannar - Konami Sasagure
 Guyver: The Bioboosted Armor - Mizusawa
 High School DxD - Mittelt
 Last Exile: Fam, the Silver Wing - Alister Algrew
 Moeyo Ken - Byakko
 Madlax - Anne Morley
 Nerima Daikon Brothers - Nurglies
 Pani Poni Dash! - Chika Sato (Ep. 5), Giant Salamander
 Princess Jellyfish - Banba
 Sakura Diaries - Urara Kasuga
 Science Ninja Team Gatchaman - Little Boy (Ep. 32), Yamori (Ep. 64), Additional Voices (ADV Dub)
 Selector Infected WIXOSS - Eldora
 Sister Princess - Aria
 UFO Ultramaiden Valkyrie - Midori
 Unbreakable Machine-Doll – Avril
 Xenosaga: The Animation - 100-Series Observational Relian Units
 Yurikuma Arashi - Katyusha Akae

References

External links

1976 births
Living people
American voice actresses
21st-century American women